Helen Day Memorial Library and Art Center is a historic building in Stowe, Vermont, United States. The building, which was built in 1863 as Stowe Village School, is currently occupied by The Current, a non-profit contemporary arts and education organization. Established in 1981, The Current hosts exhibitions of visual art by internationally and nationally recognized artists and local Vermont artists.  "Exposed" is The Current's annual outdoor sculpture exhibit.  The Current also offers art classes in a variety of media for youth and adults, as well as guided tours of exhibits, extensive public programs and a free hands-on room and Art Lounge.

There are plans to officially rename the building The Current, due to the anti-Jew persuasion of both Montanari and Lichetenhaeler, but (as of May 2022) the building still has the Helen Day Memorial Library and Art Center name on its frontage.

History
The building was founded via a bequest left by Helen Day Montanari and Marguerite E. Lichtenthaeler. Dr. Lichtenthaeler, who was born in Reading, Pennsylvania, received a medical degree from Boston University in 1916 and practiced medicine for the next twenty-five years.  In 1940, she moved to Stowe, Vermont, with Helen Day Montanari. She established her own practice in town and continued to see patients until she was eighty years old.

Helen Day Montanari was born in Boston, Massachusetts. She studied the Italian language for a year at Radcliffe College. She later married General Carlo Montanari, who was killed in World War I.  After the war was over, she brought her three children to the United States and settled in Newton, Massachusetts.  A few years later, she came down with an illness and was diagnosed by Dr. Lichtenthaeler.  The two women became lifelong friends and eventually decided to share a house in Stowe.

The two women shared intellectual interests, loved to travel, and shared a concern for the quality of life in their town. Dr. Lichtenthaeler was always counted on to rise during town meetings to plead for a library appropriation.  Mrs. Montanari, who felt just as strongly, left a $40,000 trust, after her death in 1955, for the establishment of an art center and a library. Years later, there was a successful campaign to raise the remainder of the money that was needed for the Stowe Free Library and the Helen Day Art Center.

Timeline

 1863: The Greek Revival village school was built and counterpoint to the Stowe Community Church.  They shared the same architect
 1900: Second-story wings added
 1955: Helen Day Montanari (a long-time visitor and eventual resident of Stowe) died and left a trust fund in the care of her friend, Dr. Marguerite Lichtenthaeler.  The two women shared a dream of a new library and art center for Stowe
 1974: Stowe High School moved into its new quarters on the Barrows Road.  The village school, colloquially known as "Old Yeller", was left vacant
 1980: After dedication and foresight by Historic Stowe  and the Trustees of the Helen Day Montanari Fund, restoration of the vacant school begun.  It was to be reincarnated as the Helen Day Memorial Library and Art Center and officially registered on the National Register of Historic Sites
 1981: The Stowe Free Library officially moved into the first floor of the new building
 1982: The Helen Day Art Center was officially incorporated and registered with the Secretary of State as a non-profit corporation
 1994: New additions made
 2021: The Current: A Center for Contemporary Art moved into the building

References

External links
 

Buildings and structures in Stowe, Vermont
Tourist attractions in Lamoille County, Vermont
Buildings and structures on the National Register of Historic Places in Vermont
1863 establishments in Vermont
School buildings completed in 1875
Educational institutions established in 1863
Former school buildings in the United States